Surviving the Wild a.k.a. Riley's Peak is a 2018 American family adventure film directed by Patrick Alessandrin and written by Mark Hefti. It stars Jon Voight, Jamie Kennedy, Vail Bloom, Matt Bevin, and Aidan Cullen. It was released in select theaters across America on January 12, 2018. It was produced by Steven Paul, Patrick Alessandrin, Vail Bloom, Sweta Rai, and Michael Givens.

Plot 
Against the wishes of his parents (who are in the midst of a messy divorce), a young boy steals the ashes of his dead Grandfather and runs away into the wilderness with his dog. The boy is determined to fulfill his beloved Grandpa's dying wishes and spread his ashes atop a remote mountain. Along the treacherous journey, the boy and the dog are accompanied by the ghost of his Grandpa, who helps them on their journey, brings the family back together and gives the boy one last chance to say goodbye.

Cast 
Jon Voight as Grandfather Gus
Jamie Kennedy as Kristopher
Aidan Cullen as Shaun
Vail Bloom as Rachel
Matt Bevin as Gus' friend

Distributor 
Crystal Sky Pictures, SP Releasing.

References

External links 
 
 Surviving the Wild on Flickering Myth
 Surviving the Wild on Rotten Tomatoes

2018 films
2010s adventure films
American adventure films
Films directed by Patrick Alessandrin
2010s English-language films
2010s American films